Abyei (also spelled Abyēy) is a border town currently in the Abyei Area that is disputed by South Sudan and the Sudan. The U.N. estimated the town's population at around 20,000 previous to May 2011 events.

The oil-producing and fertile Abyei Area, with Abyei town as its center, is a disputed territorial point of contention in the July 2011 secession of South Sudan process.

History

2008 conflict
Abyei town was almost completely destroyed in May 2008 when tensions escalated between the Sudan People's Liberation Army/Movement (SPLA) and the Sudanese Armed Forces (SAF) after the Government of South Sudan appointed an administrator for the region, a move the Messiria objected to.

2009
Some 50,000 of Abyei Town's inhabitants, mostly Dinka fled southwards to Agok in Southern Sudan. Since the signing of the roadmap for the return of the displaced and the implementation of the Abyei Protocol  in the Comprehensive Peace Agreement, much of the town was rebuilt by mid-2009.

2011

Abyei referendum

Whether Abyei Area and town would remain part of the South Kordofan region of northern Sudan or become part of the Bahr el Ghazal region of South Sudan (Republic of South Sudan) was to be decided by a local referendum in 2011. Disagreements over the process, and the recent violent takeover, raise questions whether a vote will be held.

Takeover
The northern Sudan military succeeded on May 21, 2011 with a forceful takeover of Abyei Area and town. A week after the takeover satellite images show that the Sudanese army burned and razed about one-third of all civilian buildings in the town during the violence.  Tens of thousands of Abyei region civilians, including up to 35,000 children, have been displaced by the northern takeover. The satellite image evidence, supporting a claim of state-sponsored ethnic cleansing of much of the contested Abyei town and region, is being submitted to the International Criminal Court (ICC) and the UN Security Council for assessment.

Climate
Abyei has a hot semi-arid climate (BSh) bordering a tropical savanna climate (Aw) under the Köppen climate classification.

See also
 2011 South Sudanese independence referendum
 Comprehensive Peace Agreement (CPA)

References

External links
 The Abyei Committee

Populated places in South Kordofan
2011 in Sudan
Bahr el Ghazal